Sick Abed is a 1920 silent comedy film produced by Famous Players-Lasky and distributed by Paramount Pictures/Artcraft, an affiliate of Paramount. It was directed by Sam Wood and stars matinee idol Wallace Reid. It is based on a 1918 Broadway stage play Sick-a-bed by Ethel Watts Mumford starring Mary Boland. The spelling of the movie varies from the spelling of the play.

This film survives at the Library of Congress.

Plot
As described in a film magazine, at the Forest of Arden Inn are domiciled John Weems (Steppling), his wife Constance (Greenwood), and Reginald Jay (Reid). At the request of Reginald, John takes a lady customer (Lazzarini) out to look at the boy's ranch property. John and the woman are held up on the road when their machine breaks down.

Meanwhile, Constance, who sees herself as a misunderstood wife, has been devoting her time to writing scenarios for motion pictures. She meets Reginald and insists that he play the part of the lover Orlando in her movie script. Jay then starts for the city in his automobile when he sees John and the lady customer coming out of a notorious roadhouse.

Reginald is shocked, but John explains that they had merely entered the place for shelter during a rain storm. John discharges his chauffeur and Jay drives him back to the Inn. To complicate matters for John, the discharged chauffeur tells Constance that John was in the roadhouse with a strange woman, whereupon Constance decides to obtain a divorce.

New staying in the city, John, aware that Reginald will be called as a witness since he has been served with a subpoena, induces Reginald to pretend that he is ill, and has hired two quack doctors, Drs. Macklyn (Geldart) and Widner (Littlefield), to carry out the scheme. The beautiful Nurse Durant (Daniels) is also hired, and Reginald quickly falls in love with her.

Constance obtains Reginald's temperature chart and obtains an order of the court for his examination by a neutral physician. When he realizes his nurse has been fired, Reginald jumps out of bed in pursuit of her. He finds her and brings her back.

Just before the neutral physician examines him, Nurse Durant kisses Reginald, and Dr. Flexner (Bolder) finds that Reginald's heart action registers badly. Constance, realizing that she has lost her Orlando, makes up her mind to retain her husband and asks his forgiveness. The two quack doctors then leave the place while the going is good.

Cast
Wallace Reid as Reginald Jay
Bebe Daniels as Nurse Durant
John Steppling as John Weems
Winifred Greenwood as Constance Weems
Tully Marshall as Detective Chalmers
Clarence Geldart as Dr. Macklyn
Lucien Littlefield as Dr. Widner
Robert Bolder as Dr. Flexner
Lorenza Lazzarini as Customer
George Kuwa as Wing Chow

Reception
Laurence Reid, writing for Motion Picture News, gave it a favorable review on July 3, 1920, writing: "Here's one picture which does not have to rely upon dialogue to score. The original version [a stage play] carried its mirth-provoking puns, too. But their absence is not felt because of the wealth of comedy business and the zest with which the players enact their parts."

See also
Wallace Reid filmography

References

External links

The AFI Catalog of Feature Films:Sick Abed
Sick Abed ; allmovie.com
lobby poster, long

1920 films
American silent feature films
American films based on plays
Films directed by Sam Wood
Famous Players-Lasky films
1920 comedy films
Silent American comedy films
American black-and-white films
1920s American films
1920s English-language films